KQAZ (101.7 FM, "Majik 101.7") is a radio station licensed to serve Springerville, Arizona, United States. The station is owned by William and Mary Ann Konopnicki through licensee WSK Family Credit Shelter Trust UTA. It airs an adult contemporary format.

The station was assigned the KQAZ call letters by the Federal Communications Commission on February 6, 1984.

References

External links
KQAZ official website

QAZ
Mainstream adult contemporary radio stations in the United States
Mass media in Apache County, Arizona